The Florida version of the NWA United States Tag Team Championship was a major professional wrestling tag team championship. The title was defended sporadically in the National Wrestling Alliance affiliated Championship Wrestling from Florida from 1961 to 1962, 1978 to 1980, and then 1983 until 1986. While its name suggests it was defended throughout the United States, the title was actually a regional championship that was only defended throughout the Florida territory. The 1978-80 version of the United States Tag Team Championship belt inspired the current design for the NWA United States Tag Team Championship, upon reactivation in 2022.

Title history

Footnotes

See also

List of National Wrestling Alliance championships

References

Championship Wrestling from Florida championships
National Wrestling Alliance championships
Tag team wrestling championships
United States professional wrestling championships